King Solomon's Dome, also called King Solomon Dome, (Hän: Ch'ë`gaa tsòk) is a  peak in the Yukon-Mackenzie Divide region of the Yukon Territory, Canada. The mountain's name comes from King Solomon, an ancient king of Israel who was famed for his riches.

During the gold rush, the mountain was the site of large-scale gold mining and excavation. After the largest sources of gold ore were exhausted, small family-owned operations moved into the area and continue mining gold on and near the mountain today. A communications tower is located atop the mountain, and in 2001, the tower was the site of a fatal accident. The trail for the Yukon Quest 1,000-mile sled dog race passes over the mountain every February.

The mountain is in a subarctic climate region, and is covered by an average snowpack of  during March and April.

References

External links
 Two Yukon Quest mushers climbing King Solomon's Dome in 2007

One-thousanders of Yukon
Yukon Quest
Klondike Gold Rush
Hän